Brut is a brand name for a line of men's grooming and fragrance products marketed around the world by Unilever - except in the United States, Canada, Mexico, Puerto Rico and Latin America, where it is owned by High Ridge Brands Company; and in Australia, New Zealand and the Pacific Islands, where it is owned by Pharmacare Laboratories.

History
Brut was launched in 1964 by the American firm Fabergé Inc. and has been owned since 1989 by the British multinational company Unilever. 

In 2003, Unilever divested the rights to the brand in several countries - for the United States, Canada, Mexico, Puerto Rico and Latin America, the rights were acquired by Helen of Troy Limited - for Australia, New Zealand and the Pacific Islands, the rights were acquired by PharmaCare Laboratories. In June 2021, High Ridge Brands acquired Brut and several personal care brands from Helen of Troy Limited.

Products

The Brut line grew to include aftershave, balms and deodorant. Packaged in a green glass bottle with a silver-coloured medallion, it is still sold as of 2022.

In 1968, a budget range was marketed as Brut 33, because it contained 33% of the fragrance of the original product. Packaged in cheaper plastic bottles, it was described by the company as a "lighter fragrance."

Fabergé was taken over by Unilever in 1989 and was transferred to the Chesebrough-Ponds division in 1989. There, the Brut 33 range took over the name Brut. The Fabergé version became "Brut Classic by Fabergé" and retained its distinctive packaging.

Apart from some regions, Unilever sells Brut around the world, with big markets in the United Kingdom, France and the Far East. Australia produces its own Brut aftershave, which is purported to have a slightly different scent. In Brazil, there is a Brut branded lather shaving cream in a tube, with the classic Brut fragrance.

Celebrity endorsements
The star of the 1970s United Kingdom advertising campaign was boxer Henry Cooper, who used the slogan "splash it all over". Motorcycling world champion Barry Sheene, athlete David Hemery, showjumper Harvey Smith and footballer Kevin Keegan, also appeared in the campaigns. In Germany, the brand was endorsed in the 1970s by football player, Franz Beckenbauer. Another footballer, Paul Gascoigne, also starred in an advertising campaign, although he was later dropped amid domestic violence allegations made by his ex-wife. In 1973, Allan Moffat drove a Brut 33 sponsored Ford Mustang in the Australian Touring Car Championship, followed by a Brut 33 sponsored XB Ford Falcon GT in 1974. In 1980, Joe Namath starred in an infamous ad which depicted him having a “Brut Day,” in which everything went his way. In 2020, Unilever rebooted its Brut advertising by recruiting former footballer Vinnie Jones for their "No Messing About" advertisement campaign. In its 'tongue-in-cheek' advertisement, poking fun at more pretentious perfume adverts, Brut urged you to forget silk sheets, sexual prowess and gold nuggets, with the slogan "It just smells good - no messing about."

Popular culture
When he acted out the role of James Bond, Roger Moore once used an aerosol version similar to this deodorant for self-defence in Live and Let Die, by touching the ignited end of a cigar he was smoking to the aerosol spray and thus improvising a crude flamethrower, since the propellant chemicals are flammable. In 2015, Jim Harbaugh was quoted saying "I've been a Brut man since I was 10 years old." Also, Elvis Presley used Brut. In the film Over the Top, Sylvester Stallone picks up a tractor trailer of Brut in California before taking his son on an eastbound cross-country trip.

References

External links

 Brut For Men
 Brut Europe
 Brut USA
 Brut Australia
 Brut New Zealand

Perfumes
Shaving cream brands
Products introduced in 1964
Unilever brands